The Koyon is a river in Iskitimsky District of Novosibirsk Oblast, Russia. It is a right tributary of the Berd. The length of the river is 54 kilometers (34 mi). By the Koyon lie the settlements of Mikhaylovka, Verkh-Koyon, Nizhny Koyon and Morozovo.

Gallery

References

Rivers of Novosibirsk Oblast